Steven Morris Zelditch (13 September 1953 – 11 September 2022) was an American mathematician, specializing in global analysis, complex geometry, and mathematical physics (e.g. quantum chaos).

Zelditch received in 1975 from Harvard University his bachelor's degree in mathematics and in 1981 from the University of California, Berkeley his Ph.D. under Alan Weinstein with thesis Reconstruction of singularities of solutions for Schrödinger's equations. From 1981 to 1985 Zelditch was Ritt Assistant Professor at Columbia University. At Johns Hopkins University he was from 1985 to 1989 an assistant Professor, from 1989 to 1992 an associate professor, and from 1992 to 2010 a professor. In 2010 he moved to Northwestern University, where he was Wayne and Elizabeth Jones Professor of Mathematics.

In 1987/88 he was at MIT and in 1988 a visiting professor at MSRI.

He has done research on the spectral and scattering theory of the Laplace operator on Riemannian manifolds and especially the asymptotic and distribution of its eigenfunctions (e.g. quantum ergodicity in billiard geometries). He has also done research on the inverse spectral problem. (This problem is described in Can you hear the shape of a drum? by Mark Kac.) Among Zelditch's other research topics are Bergman kernels, Kähler metrics, Gaussian random waves, and random metrics.

In 2002 he was an invited speaker with talk Asymptotics of polynomials and eigenfunctions at the International Congress of Mathematicians in Beijing. He was elected a Fellow of the American Mathematical Society in 2012.

In 2013, he and Xiaojun Huang shared the Stefan Bergman Prize for research done independently; Zelditch was cited for his research on the Bergman kernel.

Prior to his death, he was on the editorial boards of Communications in Mathematical Physics, Analysis & PDE, and the Journal of Geometric Analysis.

Selected publications

Articles
 Reconstruction of singularities for solutions of Schrödinger's equation, Communications in Mathematical Physics, Vol. 90, 1983, pp. 1–26
 Uniform distribution of eigenfunctions on compact hyperbolic surfaces, Duke Mathematical Journal, Vol. 55, 1987, pp. 919–941 
 with Maciej Zworski: Ergodicity of eigenfunctions for ergodic billiards, Comm. Math. Phys., Vol. 175, 1996, 673–682
 Quantum Ergodicity of C* Dynamical Systems, Comm. Math. Phys., 177, 1996, 507–528
 "Szegö kernels and a theorem of Tian." International Mathematics Research Notices, Vol. 1998, no. 6, 1998, 317–331 
 with Bernard Shiffman: Distribution of Zeros of Random and Quantum Chaotic Sections of Positive Line Bundles, Communications in Mathematical Physics, Vol. 200, 1999, pp. 661–683  arXiv preprint
 with Pavel Bleher and B. Shiffman: Universality and scaling of correlations between zeros on complex manifolds, Inventiones mathematicae, vol. 142, 2000, pp. 351–395  arXiv preprint
 From random polynomials to symplectic geometry, Proc. Internat. Congress Math. Phys. 2000
 Survey of the inverse spectral problem, surveys in Diff. Geom., 2004
 Complex zeros of real ergodic eigenfunctions, Invent. Math., Vol. 167, 2007, 419–443, Arxiv
 Local and Global Analysis of Natural Functions, Handbook of Geometric Analysis, Volume 1, 2008
 Recent developments in mathematical quantum chaos, Current Developments in Mathematics 2009
 with Frank Ferrari and Semyon Klevtsov: Random Geometry, Quantum Gravity and the Kähler Potential, Phys. Lett. 705, 2011
 IAS / Park City Lectures on Eigenfunctions 2013
 Eigenfunctions and nodal sets, Surveys in Differential Geometry, Vol. 18, 2013, 237–308

Books
 Selberg trace formulae and equidistribution theorems for closed geodesics and Laplace eigenfunctions: finite area surfaces, American Mathematical Society 1992
 Eigenfunctions of the Laplacian on a Riemannian manifold, American Mathematical Society 2017

References

External links
 C.V. with Selected Publications

1953 births
2022 deaths
20th-century American mathematicians
21st-century American mathematicians
PDE theorists
Harvard College alumni
UC Berkeley College of Letters and Science alumni
Northwestern University faculty
Johns Hopkins University faculty
Fellows of the American Mathematical Society